The term ruling grade is usually used as a synonym for "steepest climb" between two points on a railroad. More simply, the steepest grade to be climbed dictates how powerful the motive power (or how light the train) must be in order for the run to be made without assistance. Even if 99% of the line could be run with a low-powered (and inexpensive) locomotive, if at some point on the line there is a steeper gradient than such train would be able to climb, this gradient "rules" that a more powerful locomotive must be used, in spite of it being far too powerful for the rest of the line. This is why special "helper engines" (also dubbed "Bankers") are often stationed near steep grades on otherwise mild tracks. It is cheaper than running a too-powerful locomotive over the entire track mileage just in order to make the grade, especially when multiple trains run over the line each day (to help justify the fixed daily cost of the helper operation).

In the 1953 edition of Railway Engineering William H. Hay says "The ruling grade may be defined as the maximum gradient over which a tonnage train can be hauled with one locomotive....The ruling grade does not necessarily have the maximum gradient on the division. Momentum grades, pusher grades, or those that must regularly be doubled by tonnage trains may be heavier." This means the "ruling grade" may change if the management chooses to operate the railroad differently.

Compensation for curvature 
Other things being equal, a train is harder to pull around a curve than it is on straight track because the wagons – especially bogie (2 axle) wagons – try to follow the chord of the curve and not the arc. To compensate for this, the gradient should be a little less steep the sharper the curve is; the necessary grade reduction is assumed to be given by a simple formula such as 0.04 per cent per "degree of curve", the latter being a measure of curve sharpness used in the United States. On a 10-degree curve (radius 573.7 feet) the grade would thus need to be 0.4% less than the grade on straight track.

Compensation for gradients in tunnels 

Tunnels on steep gradients can present problems for air-breathing locomotives, such as steam locomotives and diesel locomotives. Poor ventilation in long or narrow tunnels can starve the locomotive of power. The solution is analogous to compensation for curvature and requires the gradient in the tunnel and for some distance on either side to be greatly reduced compared to the ruling grade. Unfortunately, the necessary compensation for gradient is not a simple equation, but is rather a trial and error process. Since one cannot build several tunnels to find out which one is best, it is useful to study existing tunnels with steep gradients.

Moisture from exhausts and springs can also make the rails slippery, and allowance may need to be taken for that as well.

General situation in North America
In steam days Southern Pacific trains eastward across Nevada and Utah faced nothing steeper than 0.43% in the 531 miles from Sparks to Ogden—except for a few miles of 1.4% east of Wells. Trains would leave Sparks with enough engine to manage the 0.43% grade (e.g. a 2-10-2 with a 5500-ton train) and would get helper engines at Wells; the "ruling grade" from Sparks to Ogden could be considered 0.43%. But nowadays the railroad doesn't base helper engines at Wells so trains must leave Sparks with enough power to climb the 1.4%, making that the division's ruling grade.

As such, the term can be ambiguous; and is even more ambiguous if the ruling grade is impacted by the effect of a momentum grade. Overland Route trains from Sacramento, California to Oakland face nothing steeper than 0.5% on Track 1, the traditional westward track, but nowadays they might need to approach the Benicia bridge on Track 2, which includes 0.7 miles at about 1.9% on otherwise near-level track.  Using this as an example, several issues arise on defining "ruling grade".  One issue is whether a running start should be assumed and, if yes, the speed to assume.  Another issue is the train length to assume, given that certain lengths exceed the length of the hill in question.  And if a running start at some arbitrary speed is assumed, the calculated "ruling grade" will be different for locomotives having different power-vs-speed characteristics.

In the United States, Congress set the Standard Grade for railroads eligible for subsidies and grants in the 1850s. They took as that standard the one adopted by the Cumberland – Wheeling Railway, that grade being 116 feet per mile (2.2%). Later when charters were drawn up for the Canadian Pacific Railway in Canada and for the Union Pacific Railroad, the national governments imposed the Standard Ruling Grade on the two lines because each received federal assistance and regulation. (Vance, JE Jr.,1995)

Summits 
A ruling grade is often found at a long climb up to a summit. Ideally, the cutting at the summit should be as deep as possible, such as at Shap, as this helps reduce the amount of climb and the steepness of the gradient. Alternately, a summit tunnel should be provided, such as at Ardglen.

Curve and Gradient Books 
 Australian Rail Track Corporation – excludes Transport Asset Holding Entity lines, and non-operational country lines.

Other tunnels 
 (in order of steepness)
 Otira Tunnel 1 in 33 – 3%
 Swan View Tunnel 1 in 49 – 2.04% - asphyxiation death in 1942
 Devonshire Tunnel 1 in 50 – 2.00% - on other side of summit to Combe Down Tunnel
 Dove Holes Tunnel 1 in 90 – 1.11% - 1865
 Box Tunnel 1 in 100 – 1.00% - 1839 – double track
 Combe Down Tunnel 1 in 100 – 1.00% ; (1 in 131 average) – 1874 – fume problems
 Connaught Tunnel 1 in 105 – 0.95% - 1916 – double track when built – ventilation problems
 Woodhead Tunnel 1 in 201 – 0.50% - 1845 – twin bores

See also 

 Grade (slope)
 Hillclimbing (railway)
 List of steepest gradients on adhesion railways
 Mountain railway
 Old Main Line (Baltimore and Ohio Railroad)
 Rack railway

References 

Track geometry